Howard Owen Mounce (born 1939) is a British philosopher and Honorary Fellow of the University of Wales Swansea. He is the editor of the journal Philosophical Investigations.

Books
 Wittgenstein's Tractatus: An Introduction (Blackwell, 1990)
 The Two Pragmatisms (Routledge, 1997)
 Hume's Naturalism (Routledge, 1999)

References

20th-century British philosophers
Philosophy academics
1939 births
Living people